Bill Conway is an American politician from Chicago. He is the alderperson-elect for Chicago City Council's 34th ward, and will take office on May 13, 2023. He was previously a prosecutor and ran an unsuccessful campaign for Cook County State's Attorney in 2020.

References 

Chicago City Council members